Distrianthes exxonmobilensis is a species of flowering plant in the showy mistletoe family Loranthaceae, native to Papua New Guinea. There it is found in karstic habitats.

References

Loranthaceae
Endemic flora of Papua New Guinea
Plants described in 2015